The Maryland Democratic Party is the affiliate of the Democratic Party in the state of Maryland, headquartered in Annapolis. The current state party chair is Yvette Lewis. It is currently the dominant party in the state, controlling all but one of Maryland's eight U.S. House seats, both U.S. Senate seats, all statewide executive offices and supermajorities in both houses of the state legislature.

History
The Maryland Democratic Party is among the oldest continuously existing political organizations in the world.  On May 21, 1827, a meeting of Andrew Jackson supporters organized a political structure in the state designed to help Jackson win the Presidency after he was denied victory in the 1824 United States presidential election despite winning the popular vote. The first meeting of the Democratic (Jackson) Central Committee was held at the Atheneum in Baltimore City, located on the southwest corner of St. Paul and Lexington Streets.

Twelve delegates from each county and six delegates from Baltimore City were invited to attend. The label "Central Committee" was adopted along with a "Committee of Correspondence" which functioned like the present Executive Committee. Thomas M. Forman, Cecil County, was chosen to preside with William M. Beall, Frederick County, appointed Secretary and John S. Brooke, Prince George's County, appointed as Assistant Secretary. In addition to its founding, the Maryland Democratic Party hosted the first six Democratic National Conventions from 1832 to 1852 held in Baltimore. On May 31, 1838, Maryland Democrats gathered in a state party convention to nominate William Grason for Governor. He became the first popularly elected Governor in Maryland with the help of central committees throughout the state.

After the ratification of the Suffrage Amendment in 1920, the Democratic State Central Committee added an equal number of women to its membership, a practice still embodied in National Party Rules and in the elections for Cecil County Democratic State Central Committee.

The first six Democratic National Conventions were held in Baltimore, for a total of nine to date.

Historically the Democratic Party has been the dominant party in Maryland politics. Since the 1838 Maryland gubernatorial election, the first gubernatorial election in Maryland in which the governor was elected by direct popular vote, 28 Maryland Governors have been Democrats. Since the 1895 Maryland Comptroller election, the first Comptroller election in Maryland in which the Comptroller was elected by direct popular vote, 17 Maryland Comptrollers have been Democrats. Since the 1895 Maryland Attorney General election, the first Attorney General election in Maryland in which the Attorney General was elected by direct popular vote, 23 Attorneys General have been Democrats. The party has held continuous control of the Maryland General Assembly since 1920, the longest currently running streak of control by a single party of a state legislature in the United States.

Elected officials

Members of Congress
Democrats comprise nine of Maryland's ten-member Congressional delegation:

U.S. Senate
Since 1987, Democrats have controlled both of Maryland's seats in the U.S. Senate:

U.S. House of Representatives
Democrats hold seven of the eight seats Maryland is apportioned in the U.S. House following the 2000 census:

Statewide officeholders
Beginning in January 2023, Democrats control all four statewide offices:
Governor: Wes Moore
Lieutenant Governor: Aruna Miller
Attorney General: Anthony Brown
Comptroller: Brooke Lierman

County government
Until 2010, the Democratic Party of Maryland held majority power at the County level. As of 2018 the Democrats only hold control in ten out of 23 Maryland's county governments including Baltimore City. The mayor of Baltimore is Brandon Scott.

Legislative leadership 
 President of the Senate: Bill Ferguson 
 President Pro Tempore of the Senate: Melony G. Griffith
 Senate Majority Leader: Nancy J. King
 Speaker of the House of Delegates: Adrienne A. Jones
 Speaker Pro Tempore of the House of Delegates: Sheree Sample-Hughes
 House Majority Leader: Marc Korman
 House Majority Whip: Jazz Lewis

Electoral performance

Presidential

Party organization

Party chairs (1988–present)
Yvette Lewis (2019–present)
Cory V. McCray (acting) (2019)
Maya Rockeymoore Cummings (2018–2019)
Kathleen Matthews, (2017-2018)
Bruce Poole (2015–2017)
Yvette Lewis (2011–2015)
Peter O'Malley (2011)
Susan Turnbull (2009–2011)
Michael Cryor (2007–2009)
Terry Lierman  (2004–2007)
Ike Leggett (2002–2004)
Wayne Rogers (2000–2002)
Peter B. Krauser (1997–2000)
Gov. Harry Hughes (1994–1997)
Vera Hall (1993–1994)
Nate Landow (1988–1993)

Party officers
Party Chair: Yvette Lewis
First Vice Chair: Everett Browning
Second Vice Chair: Judy Wixted
Third Vice Chair: Ruben Amaya
Treasurer: Devang Shah
Secretary: Corynne Courpas
Deputy Treasurer: Diana Emerson
Deputy Secretary: Gabe Gough
Parliamentarian: Greg Pecorara
DNC Member: Bel Leong-Hong
DNC Member: Robbie Leonard
DNC Member: Bob Kresslein
DNC Member: Cheryl S. Landis

Party staff
Executive Director: Vicent Harrington
Communications Director: Brandon Stoneburg
Fundraising Director: Jamie Conway
Digital Director: Morgan Murphy 
Senior Advisor: Meredith Bowman
Data & Technology Director: Tyler Carr
Organizing Director: Justin Butler

Affiliated groups
United Democratic Women's Clubs of Maryland
Young Democrats of Maryland
Democratic Women's PAC of Maryland
United Democrats of Frederick County
Green Dems
Democratic Party (United States)

See also

Political party strength in Maryland

References

External links
 Maryland Democratic Party

 
Democratic Party (United States) by state
Political parties established in 1827
Democratic Party
1827 establishments in Maryland